Storbreen ("The Large Glacier") is a glacier in Torell Land at Spitsbergen, Svalbard. It has a length of about fifteen kilometers, and debouches towards the bay of Brepollen, the inner part of Hornsund.

References 

Glaciers of Spitsbergen